11509 Thersilochos  is a Jupiter trojan from the Trojan camp, approximately  in diameter. It was discovered on 15 November 1990, by Belgian astronomer Eric Elst at the La Silla Observatory in northern Chile. The dark Jovian asteroid belongs to the 100 largest Jupiter trojans and has a rotation period of 17.4 hours. It was named after the Trojan warrior Thersilochus from Greek mythology.

Orbit and classification 

Thersilochos is a dark Jovian asteroid in a 1:1 orbital resonance with Jupiter. It is located in the trailering Trojan camp at the Gas Giant's  Lagrangian point, 60° behind its orbit . It is also a non-family asteroid of the Jovian background population. It orbits the Sun at a distance of 4.4–5.9 AU once every 11 years and 9 months (4,306 days; semi-major axis of 5.18 AU). Its orbit has an eccentricity of 0.14 and an inclination of 19° with respect to the ecliptic.

Physical characteristics 

Thersilochos is an assumed C-type asteroid, while the majority of the larger Jovian asteroids are D-types.

Rotation period 

In July 2007, a rotational lightcurve of Thersilochos was obtained from a total of six nights of photometric observations by Italian astronomer Stefano Mottola at the Calar Alto Observatory in Spain. Lightcurve analysis gave a well-defined rotation period of  hours with a brightness variation of 0.27 magnitude.

Follow-up observations in the R-band by astronomers at the Palomar Transient Factory in November 2013, and by Daniel Coley at the Center for Solar System Studies in December 2014, gave two concurring periods of 17.329 and 17.389 hours.

Diameter and albedo 

According to the surveys carried out by the Japanese Akari satellite and the NEOWISE mission of NASA's Wide-field Infrared Survey Explorer, Thersilochos between 49.96 and 56.23 kilometers in diameter and its surface has an albedo of 0.065 and 0.051, respectively. The Collaborative Asteroid Lightcurve Link assumes a standard albedo for a carbonaceous asteroid of 0.057 and calculates a diameter of 53.16 kilometers based on an absolute magnitude of 10.1.

Naming 

This minor planet was named from Greek mythology after the Trojan warrior Thersilochus, who fought with Hector at the battle for the dead body of Patroclus and was later slain by Achilles. The official naming citation was published by the Minor Planet Center on 6 January 2003.

Notes

References

External links 
 Asteroid Lightcurve Database (LCDB), query form (info )
 Dictionary of Minor Planet Names, Google books
 Discovery Circumstances: Numbered Minor Planets (10001)-(15000) – Minor Planet Center
 Asteroid 11509 Thersilochos at the Small Bodies Data Ferret
 
 

011509
Discoveries by Eric Walter Elst
Named minor planets
19901115